Suicide machines may mean:

 machines for auto-euthanasia, see euthanasia device
 fictional machines for suicide, see suicide booth
 The Suicide Machines, an American punk rock band
 The Suicide Machines (album), an album by the aforementioned group
 The Suicide Machines / Potshot, an EP by the aforementioned group